Bad Cop, Bad Cop is a 2002 Australian television series produced
by the Australian Broadcasting Corporation and Southern Star, directed by David Caesar

Cast
 Michael Caton – Det. Red Lilywhite
 Dan Wyllie – Det. Cons. Lou Knutt
 Helen Thomson – lawyer Tracy Lafever
 Roy Billing – Assistant Commissioner "Pud" Tugwell
 Chris Hobbs – Slim Azzopardi

Premise
The series is a black comedy about two utterly corrupt police officers Lilywhite and Knutt (the "bad cop, bad cop" of the title). Lafever is their friend, a lawyer with a relaxed attitude to the goings on. Police graft, corruption and brutality are satirised in a very dry comic fashion, and with a stream of matter-of-fact obscenities.  The series is shot in the eastern suburbs of Sydney, with Lilywhite and Knutt often seen drinking at the Clovelly Bowling Club and numerous references to Maroubra.

The title is a reference to the tactic of good cop, bad cop; though in this case both cops are as bad as each other.

References

External links
 

Australian Broadcasting Corporation original programming
Australian comedy television series
2002 Australian television series debuts
2003 Australian television series endings
Television shows set in Sydney
Television series by Endemol Australia